Somersby may refer to:
Somersby, Lincolnshire, England
Somersby, New South Wales, Australia

Other
Somersby cider, a Danish brand of cider
SS Somersby, a British cargo steamship built in 1930
Sommersby, a 1993 film starring Richard Gere and Jodie Foster

See also
Somerby (disambiguation)